Alessandro Morbidelli (born 31 March 1989 in Rome) is an Italian footballer who played as a forward. He played for Italian Serie C2 teams A.S. Cisco Calcio Roma and Pomezia Calcio.

External links

Alessandro Morbidelli's profile on Cisco Roma's official website 

1989 births
Living people
Footballers from Rome
Italian footballers
Atletico Roma F.C. players
Association football forwards